The 2022 Asian Women's Volleyball Challenge Cup in coincidence with 21st Princess Cup Volleyball Championship, was the third edition of the Asian Women's Volleyball Challenge Cup, a biennial international volleyball tournament organised by the Asian Volleyball Confederation (AVC) with Thailand Volleyball Association (TVA). The tournament was held in Nakhon Pathom, Thailand, from 24 to 29 June 2022.

Qualification
Following the AVC regulations, The maximum of 16 teams in all AVC events will be selected by:
1 team for the host country
10 teams based on the final standing of the previous edition
5 teams from each of 5 zones (with a qualification tournament if needed)

Qualified teams
As there was no tournament held from the first 2 editions, the following teams qualified for the tournament, not included the host Thailand U20 who participated for the 21st Princess Cup Volleyball Championship only. Later Mongolia, New Zealand and Sri Lanka withdraw from the tournament.

Pool standing procedure
 Total number of victories (matches won, matches lost)
 In the event of a tie, the following first tiebreaker will apply: The teams will be ranked by the most point gained per match as follows:
 Match won 3–0 or 3–1: 3 points for the winner, 0 points for the loser
 Match won 3–2: 2 points for the winner, 1 point for the loser
 Match forfeited: 3 points for the winner, 0 points (0–25, 0–25, 0–25) for the loser
 If teams are still tied after examining the number of victories and points gained, then the AVC will examine the results in order to break the tie in the following order:
 Set quotient: if two or more teams are tied on the number of points gained, they will be ranked by the quotient resulting from the division of the number of all set won by the number of all sets lost.
 Points quotient: if the tie persists based on the set quotient, the teams will be ranked by the quotient resulting from the division of all points scored by the total of points lost during all sets.
 If the tie persists based on the point quotient, the tie will be broken based on the team that won the match of the Round Robin Phase between the tied teams. When the tie in point quotient is between three or more teams, these teams ranked taking into consideration only the matches involving the teams in question.

Results
All times are Indochina Time (UTC+07:00)

Ranking of the 3rd Asian Women's Volleyball Challenge Cup

|}

Ranking of the Princess Cup Volleyball Championship

|}
|}

Final standing

Awards

Most Valuable Player

Best Setter

Best Outside Spikers

Best Middle Blocker

Best Opposite Spiker

Best Libero

See also
2022 Asian Men's Volleyball Challenge Cup
2022 Asian Women's Volleyball Cup

References

2022
Asian Challenge Cup
Challenge Cup, Women, 2022
Asian Women's Volleyball Challenge Cup
Asian Women's Volleyball Challenge Cup